Jessica Alyssa Cerro (born 14 August 1995), who performs as Montaigne, is an Australian art pop musician and Twitch streamer. Her debut album, Glorious Heights, was released on 5 August 2016 and peaked at No. 4 on the ARIA Albums Chart. At the ARIA Music Awards of 2016 she won Breakthrough Artist – Release for the album and was nominated for three other categories. In April 2016 she was a featured vocalist on Hilltop Hoods' track, "1955", which reached No. 2 on the ARIA Singles Chart. She was supposed to represent  Australia in the Eurovision Song Contest 2020 with her song "Don't Break Me", until the contest was cancelled due to the COVID-19 pandemic. Instead, she represented Australia in the Eurovision Song Contest 2021 with the song "Technicolour", but did not qualify from the semi-final, becoming the first Australian entrant not to qualify to the final since the debut of Australia in 2015.

Biography

Early life
Cerro was born in Sydney on 14 August 1995, and was raised in the Hills District. Her father Gus Cerro was a professional football player who played in the Australian National Soccer League, as well as for Negeri Sembilan FA and Pahang FA in Malaysia. Cerro has stated that her "ethnic background is a mixture of Argentinian, Spanish, Filipino and French".

2012–13: Career beginnings
Jessica Cerro was a Triple J Unearthed High School finalist in 2012 with her indie pop song "Anyone But Me" but she waited until finishing high school to pursue her music career. In November 2012, Cerro signed a publishing deal with Albert Music and spent the following two years refining her songwriting skills under the guidance of Michael Szumowski.

In late 2013, Cerro decided to adopt the moniker Montaigne, inspired by the 16th century philosopher and essayist Michel de Montaigne. Shortly after completing her HSC Montaigne began recording her debut EP with producer Tony Buchen (The Preatures, Andy Bull).

2014–16: Glorious Heights

In 2014, Montaigne released her first single "I Am Not an End", which was added to high rotation on Triple J. In July 2014 Montaigne signed a management and recording deal with Wonderlick Entertainment. On 21 November 2014, she performed "I Am Not an End" for the radio station's Like a Version segment, along with her cover of Sia's "Chandelier". The song was listed as its 36th most played song of 2014. The same day Montaigne also released her second single "I'm a Fantastic Wreck", in conjunction with the Life of Montaigne EP. "I'm a Fantastic Wreck" also received high rotation on Triple J and Sydney-based community radio station FBi Radio, which also listed the song as its eighth most played song of 2014.

Montaigne was selected by San Cisco as the support act for their Run tour in November 2014. Shortly after, she was also chosen by Megan Washington to be the main support for her February 2015 national There There tour.

In January 2015, Montaigne won FBi Radio's Next Big Thing Award at its annual SMAC Awards, which recognises "the musicians, artists, performers, restaurants and events that shaped the Sydney's creative culture in 2014". Montaigne announced her first headline tour in February 2015, visiting Brisbane, Sydney, Melbourne and Perth in April.

In August 2015, she released "Clip My Wings", the first single from her debut studio album, Glorious Heights. In January 2016, Montaigne released "In the Dark", the second single from her debut album, along with the announcement of the In the Dark Tour. A music video for the song followed in March. The following month, she featured on Hilltop Hoods' song "1955", which reached number 2 in Australia.

In June 2016, Montaigne released the third single from her debut album Glorious Heights, titled "Because I Love You". On 30 July, "Because I Love You" debuted at number 98 on the ARIA Singles Chart, marking Montaigne's first solo chart appearance. Glorious Heights was released a week later on 5 August. In November 2016, at the ARIA Music Awards of 2016, Montaigne won the ARIA award for Breakthrough Artist – Release.

2017–2021: Complex and Eurovision

On 4 May 2017, Montaigne was featured on Akouo's single "Feel That". In 2018, she was featured on the track "The Best Freestylers in the World" from the Aunty Donna album, The Album.

In November 2018 Montaigne released "For Your Love" as the lead single from her upcoming sophomore album. In June 2019, she released the second single "Ready" alongside the announcement that the album would be titled Complex. On 9 August 2019, the album's third single "Love Might Be Found (Volcano)" was released. The album was released on 30 August 2019, and debuted at #19 on the ARIA albums chart. "Ready" plays over the end credits of the 2022 film Good Luck to You, Leo Grande starring Emma Thompson.

On 6 December 2019, Montaigne, along with fellow singer Didirri, were announced as two out of the ten participating performers for Eurovision - Australia Decides the Australian national final in which the winner would represent Australia in the Eurovision Song Contest 2020 with the song "Don't Break Me". On 8 February 2020, she won the competition, and would have competed in the Eurovision Song Contest 2020, to be held in Rotterdam in May 2020, but on 18 March 2020, the EBU announced that the Eurovision Song Contest 2020 has been cancelled due to the uncertainty created by the spread of COVID-19. On 19 March 2020, Montaigne made a Facebook post clarifying her feelings, saying "I've had my cry. I spent a couple of hours paralysed in bed, despondently scrolling through the many lovely tweet mentions from people expressing their love and support. I imagine I'll probably have a lot more cries in the next little while, for me and for the wonderful team who were working with me to make our vision come to life." She stated that she agreed with the cancellation choice saying it was "the most responsible and ethical decision that the EBU could have made."

On 2 April 2020, SBS confirmed that Montaigne would represent Australia at the 2021 contest.
Montaigne's Eurovision Song Contest 2021 entry, "Technicolour", was released on 5 March 2021. Later, SBS announced that following a risk assessment, they would not be sending a delegation to Rotterdam and would instead compete remotely using a pre-recorded live-on-tape performance. Currently, Montaigne is the only artist to have competed in Eurovision without being present in the host city. On May 18, 2021 she competed in the first semi final of Eurovision 2021, however she did not qualify for the final, as she didn't finish within the top 10 countries. This marked the first time in Australia's participation that an Australian contestant failed to qualify for the final. It was later revealed that she had placed 14th in the first semi-final, with 28 points.

2021–present: Making It!
On 15 March 2021, the podcast My Brother, My Brother and Me revealed their new theme song to be "My Life Is Better With You" a track written and performed by Montaigne specifically for the show. The song was officially released on 13 August 2021, alongside an official music video featuring Montaigne and the McElroy Brothers.

On 22 October 2021, Montaigne released "Now (In Space)", the lead single from her third studio album. On 9 February, she was cast in the Special Broadcasting Service musical comedy Time to Buy, marking her debut lead role as an actress. Alongside the announcement, Montaigne revealed that her third studio album would be released in 2022.

On 25 February 2022, Montaigne released "Always Be You" with Talking Heads' David Byrne. In an Instagram post announcing the release, Montaigne said "It's pretty much the biggest deal in the world for me to be able to collaborate with him", crediting his book How Music Works as a "groundbreaking read [and] totally changed how I approached live performance." On 8 July 2020, Montaigne released "die b4 u" and announced the forthcoming release of her third studio album, Making It!, which was released on 2 September 2022.   

In April 2022, "Because I Love You" was featured in episode 8 of the LBTQ+ teen drama Heartstopper.

Discography

Studio albums

Extended plays

Singles

As lead artist

As featured artist

Other appearances

Notes

Awards and nominations

APRA Awards
The APRA Awards are several award ceremonies run in Australia by the Australasian Performing Right Association (APRA) to recognise composing and song writing skills, sales and airplay performance by its members annually.

|-
| 2017 || "1955"  (with Hilltop Hoods & Thom Thum ) || Song of the Year || 
|-

ARIA Music Awards
The ARIA Music Awards are annual awards, which recognises excellence, innovation, and achievement across all genres of Australian music. They commenced in 1987.

|-
| rowspan="5"| 2016 ||rowspan="2"| Glorious Heights || Best Female Artist || 
|-
| Breakthrough Artist || 
|-
|rowspan="2"| "1955"  (with Hilltop Hoods & Thom Thum ) || Song of the Year || 
|-
| Best Video || 
|-
| Tony Buchan for Glorious Heights || Producer of the Year || 
|-

J Awards
The J Awards are an annual series of Australian music awards that were established by the Australian Broadcasting Corporation's youth-focused radio station Triple J. They commenced in 2005.

|-
| J Awards of 2016
| Glorious Heights
| Australian Album of the Year
|

National Live Music Awards
The National Live Music Awards (NLMAs) are a broad recognition of Australia's diverse live industry, celebrating the success of the Australian live scene. The awards commenced in 2016.

|-
| National Live Music Awards of 2016
| herself
| Live Voice of the Year
| 
|-
| rowspan="2" | National Live Music Awards of 2017
| rowspan="2" | herself
| Live Act of the Year
| 
|-
| Live Pop Act of the Year
| 
|-
| National Live Music Awards of 2020
| herself
| Live Voice of the Year
| 
|-

References

External links

 

1995 births
21st-century Australian  women singers
ARIA Award winners
Australian women singer-songwriters
Australian indie pop musicians
Australian people of Argentine descent
Australian people of French descent
Australian people of Filipino descent
Australian people of Spanish descent
Bisexual women
Eurovision Song Contest entrants of 2020
Eurovision Song Contest entrants of 2021
Australian LGBT singers
Living people
Sony Music Australia artists